James M. Kelly (1940 – January 9, 2007) was an American politician who served on the Boston City Council for 23 years, representing South Boston, the South End and Chinatown.

Biography
Kelly was first elected to the Boston City Council in November 1983, and served from January 1984 until his death in January 2007. He was the council president from 1994 through 2000.

Kelly had previously been one of the leading opponents of court ordered busing to achieve racial integration in public schools during the 1970s. He continued to fight such plans as a member of the city council. He also attacked mandated housing integration and affirmative action.

Kelly was a graduate of South Boston High School and was a sheet metal worker before entering politics.

See also
 The Soiling of Old Glory, Pulitzer Prize-winning photograph taken in 1976 that includes Kelly

References

Further reading
 
 James M. Kelly, long-time city councilor and South Boston icon, dies. Boston Globe, Jan 9, 2007.
 James M. Kelly, 1940–2007. Boston Globe, Jan 10, 2007.
 notes to Oral History interview of James M. Hennigan Jr.

External links
 Profile at cityofboston.gov via Wayback Machine
 The Boston Globe obituary of Kelly via legacy.com

Boston City Council members
People from South Boston
20th century in Boston
1940 births
2007 deaths
20th-century American politicians
Sheet metal workers
Catholics from Massachusetts
South Boston High School alumni